may refer to:

People
Aoki (surname), a list of people with the surname

Places
Aoki, Nagano, a village in the Nagano Prefecture

Company
 Aoki Corporation, a defunct construction company
 Aoki (store), a men's clothing store based in Japan

Fictional characters
Aoki, railroad engineer of Hikari 109 in The Bullet Train
Daisuke Aoki, the male lead character of Kodomo no Jikan
Junko Aoki, a character of Crossfire
Seiichiro Aoki, one of the Dragons of Heaven from X/1999

See also